Srboljub Stamenković (Serbian Cyrillic: Србољуб Стаменковић; 31 January 1956 – 28 January 1996) was a Serbian football player. The most notable part of his career was spent in the United States playing indoor soccer for the Major Indoor Soccer League in Memphis and Baltimore. He was known professionally in the United States as Stan Stamenkovic.

Career
Born in the town of Užice (then called Titovo Užice) in Serbia, he started playing for Red Star Belgrade in 1975 and stayed until 1981, when he was transferred to the Memphis Americans of the Major Indoor Soccer League. He played there for two seasons before going to the Baltimore Blast and stayed there until 1988, after helping the team win an MISL championship in 1984. He returned to Yugoslavia afterward to start his own business, a pizza parlor. He tried a comeback with the CISL's San Jose Grizzlies in 1994 but nagging injuries, which had prompted his earlier retirement, stopped this after 8 matches.

Stamenković scored 231 career goals and tallied 311 assists for a total of 542 career points. He is sometimes referred to as the greatest player in MISL history. In 1984, he led the league with 34 goals. His unique dribbling was perfect for the indoor game. At times he made the ball look like it was on a string. He could also find a streaking player, and thread the needle behind his back, as if he had eyes in the back of his head.

Personal life
With his wife Vera, he had two children: a daughter named Jovana and a son named Nebojša who is a soccer coach.

Death
Stamenkovic died after injuring his head in a fall on a sidewalk in Užice, just three days before his fortieth birthday.

Yearly Awards
 MISL All-Star Team –; 1982, 1983, 1984
 MISL Pass-Master (most assists) – 1983, 1984
 MISL Top Points Scorer – 1984
 MISL MVP – 1984

References

External links
 MISL profile

1956 births
1996 deaths
Sportspeople from Užice
Serbian footballers
Yugoslav footballers
Yugoslav First League players
Baltimore Blast (1980–1992) players
Continental Indoor Soccer League players
Major Indoor Soccer League (1978–1992) players
Memphis Americans players
Red Star Belgrade footballers
San Jose Grizzlies players
Association football forwards
Accidental deaths from falls